Huy Fong Foods is an American hot sauce company based in Irwindale, California. It was founded by David Tran, a Vietnamese-born immigrant, beginning in 1980 on Spring Street in Los Angeles's Chinatown. It has grown to become one of the leaders in the Asian hot sauce market with its sriracha sauce, popularly referred to as "rooster sauce" or "cock sauce" due to the image of a rooster on the label.

Products
The company's most popular product is its sriracha sauce. The primary ingredients are peppers, garlic, and sugar. It was originally made with Serrano peppers and is now made with red Jalapeño peppers, reducing the overall pungency. It is currently Huy Fong Foods' best-known and best-selling item, easily recognized by its bright red color and its packaging: a clear plastic bottle with a green cap, text in five languages (Vietnamese, English, Chinese, French, and Spanish) and the rooster logo. One nickname for the product is "rooster sauce”, for the logo on the bottles. In contrast to similar hot sauces made by other manufacturers, Huy Fong's sriracha sauce does not contain fish extract, making it suitable for most vegetarians, although the presence of garlic may make it unsuitable for members of Buddhism and some Hindu denominations.

Huy Fong also makes sambal oelek and chili garlic sauces.

History

Founding and early history

Huy Fong Foods was founded by David Tran (born 1945), a Vietnamese businessman and a former Major in the Army of the Republic of Vietnam. Tran, in a cargo boat, arrived in Boston in the spring of 1979 as a part of the migration of the Vietnamese boat people following the Vietnam War. Shortly after arriving in Boston, Tran called up his brother-in-law in Los Angeles, and decided to move there after learning that there were red peppers.

After arriving in Los Angeles, Tran established his own hot sauce company which he named after the Huey Fong freighter. The rooster symbol that is a part of the Sriracha branding came from the fact that Tran was born in the Year of the Rooster on the Chinese zodiac. He incorporated Huy Fong Foods, Inc. in February 1980, within a month of arriving in Los Angeles. He had previously made hot sauce with his family while working as a cook in the South Vietnamese army. He began selling hot sauces to local Asian restaurants out of a van, making $2,300 in his first month in business.

Tran considers Huy Fong Foods to be a family business. His son William Tran is the company president and daughter Yassie Tran-Holliday is vice president.

Production

These sauces are produced on machinery that has been specially modified by David Tran, who taught himself machining and welding skills. Since 2014, the Irwindale factory has been open to visitors, and has become a tourist attraction.

The chili odor that emanated from the Irwindale factory upset the community's residents and the City of Irwindale filed a lawsuit against Huy Fong Foods in October 2013, claiming that the odor was a public nuisance. Initially, a Los Angeles Superior Court judge refused the city's bid to shut down the factory but a Los Angeles County Superior Court judge ordered the factory to essentially shut down on November 27, 2013, prohibiting all activities that could cause odors. Irwindale dropped the lawsuit on May 29, 2014, after intervention by the office of Governor Jerry Brown.

In Huy Fong Foods' production at these facilities, the company begins with purchase of chilis grown in Ventura, Los Angeles, and Kern counties and production of a mash from these; most of each year's chili mash is produced in just two months, during the autumn harvest. Earlier, the company used serrano chilis but found them difficult to harvest. The product made from the natural mash is processed such that the final product contains no artificial ingredients.

Between 1988 and 2016, Huy Fong Foods had a partnership with Underwood Ranches, which produced red jalapeños used in sriracha. By 2006, Underwood produced 90% of the peppers used by Huy Fong. Huy Fong Foods' relationship with Underwood and the Ranches ended in 2016 after—as alleged by a lawyer for Underwood—Huy Fong Foods' David Tran "attempted... to hire away Underwood’s COO in order to form a new chile-growing concern", which the lawyer described as breaking trust between the supplier and manufacturer. After a failure by Underwood to return an overpayment in 2016, Huy Fong Foods' sued Underwood Ranches. Underwood then countersued for breach of contract. The countersuit won and Huy Fong Foods was ordered to pay $23.3 million in compensation for damages.

The company has never advertised its products, relying instead on word of mouth. Production and sales of the sauces are sizeable; in 2001, the company was estimated to have sold 6,000 tons of chili products, with sales of approximately US$12 million. In 2010 the company produced 20 million bottles of sauce in a year. As of 2012 it had grown to sales of more than US$60 million a year. In 2019, the company had a 10% marketshare of the $1.55 billion hot sauce market in the United States. The company generated over $150 million in revenue as of 2022.

The company has warned customers about counterfeit versions of its sauces.

In June 2022, Huy Fong Foods announced that they would be pausing production of its popular Sriracha Hot Chili Sauce, due to a “severe shortage” of chili peppers.

Awards and recognition

In December 2009, Bon Appétit magazine named its Sriracha sauce Ingredient of the Year for 2010.

References

Further reading
  Alt URL.
Nakamura, Eric. "The Famous Hot Sauce Factory Tour!" (1997).  Giant Robot, no. 9, pp. 32–33.

External links

 Huy Fong Foods website.

Hot sauces
Brand name condiments
Companies based in Los Angeles County, California
Vietnamese cuisine
Irwindale, California
Rosemead, California
Privately held companies based in California
1980 establishments in California
Food and drink companies established in 1980
Condiment companies of the United States
Food and drink companies based in California
Family-owned companies of the United States